Niklas Anger (born 14 July 1977) was a Swedish professional ice hockey player. He was drafted 112th overall in the 1995 NHL Entry Draft by the Montreal Canadiens

Career statistics

Regular season and playoffs

International

References

External links 
 

1977 births
Living people
AIK IF players
Almtuna IS players
Brynäs IF players
Djurgårdens IF Hockey players
EHC Basel players
HC Alleghe players
HC Ambrì-Piotta players
HC Gardena players
HC Sierre players
Linköping HC players
Montreal Canadiens draft picks
Ice hockey people from Stockholm
Swedish expatriate sportspeople in Switzerland
Swedish ice hockey forwards
Timrå IK players
Wings HC Arlanda players